Connelly is an anglicised form of the Gaelic-Irish surname Ó Conghalaigh. Following is a list of notable people with the surname Connelly:

A. Scott Connelly, owner of Met-Rx, Inc.
Al Connelly, guitarist with band Glass Tiger
Ana Paula Connelly, Brazilian beach volleyball player
Bert Connelly, Canadian ice hockey player
Bill Connelly (baseball), American baseball player
Bill Connelly (soccer), American soccer player
Bob Connelly, Scottish footballer
Brent Connelly, Australian Rules footballer
Charlie Connelly, British author
Chris Connelly (journalist), American sports and entertainment writer
Chris Connelly (musician), Scottish singer/songwriter
Christopher Connelly (actor), American actor
Chuck Connelly, American painter
Cornelia Connelly, founder of the first Holy Child School
Dale Connelly, American radio host
Edward Connelly, American silent film actor
Fred Connelly, English footballer
George Connelly, Scottish footballer
Henry Connelly, Governor of New Mexico (1861–1866)
Henry C. Connelly (1832–1912), New York politician
James Connelly (ice hockey), Canadian ice hockey player
Jennifer Connelly, American actress
Jeter Connelly Pritchard, American politician
Joan Breton Connelly, American classical archaeologist
Joe Connelly (musician), American singer and musician
Joe Connelly (writer), American writer
John Connelly (disambiguation)
Karen Connelly, Canadian writer
Kevin Connelly, British comedian and impressionist
Lloyd Connelly, American Superior Court judge
Marc Connelly, American playwright
Mark Connelly (historian), British historian
Maryanne Connelly, American Democratic politician
Matthew Connelly, American educator
Matthew J. Connelly (1907–1976), American businessman and civil servant
Michael Connelly, American detective writer
Michael Connelly, American Republican politician
Michael Connelly (New Zealand politician), New Zealand Labour Party activist, father of:
Mick Connelly (Michael Aynsley Connelly), New Zealand Labour Party politician and cabinet minister.
Mike Connelly, American footballer
Peggy Connelly, American singer and actress
Peter Connelly, Video game composer
Reg Connelly, British songwriter and music publisher
Robert Connelly, American mathematician
Ross J. Connelly, COO of OPIC
Ryan Connelly (born 1995), American football player
Sean Connelly, English footballer
Sean Connelly (judge), American judge
Ted Connelly (1918–2013), Australian politician
Tina Connelly, Canadian track and field athlete
Thomas M. Connelly, Executive Vice  President of E. I. Du Pont de Nermours and Company
Tom Connelly, American baseball player
Wayne Connelly, former Canadian ice hockey player
William A. Connelly, American Sergeant Major of the Army

See also
Connolly (surname)
Connelly (disambiguation)

Surnames of Irish origin
Anglicised Irish-language surnames